Hoveyzeh Rural District is a rural district (dehestan) in the Central District of Hoveyzeh County, Khuzestan Province, Iran. At the 2006 census, its population was 8,101, in 1,333 families.  The rural district has 49 villages.

References 

Rural Districts of Khuzestan Province
Hoveyzeh County